Pendilia (singular pendilium; from Latin pendulus, hanging) or pendoulia (the Greek equivalent), are pendants or dangling ornaments hanging from a piece of metalwork such as a crown, votive crown, crux gemmata, or kamelaukion, and are a feature of Early Medieval goldsmith work.  On crosses the pendilia may include the letters alpha and omega, and on votive offerings, which were often designed to be hung over altars and where pendilia are at their largest and most spectacular, they may spell out whole words (see illustration).

The term is commonly used in coin collecting. Pendilia are depicted on coins as jewels or pearls hanging from the sides of the crown, and occur frequently on coins of Byzantine emperors. The pendilia which hung from the Emperors' crowns began with Marcian. Although the years saw the styles of crown change, the pendilia remained, at least through Manuel II Palaiologos. Surviving crowns with pendilia include the Holy Crown of Hungary and many votive crowns of the Treasure of Guarrazar from Visigothic Spain.

The historical origin of the pendilies is largely in the dark, they are extremely rare on early pieces of jewelry (exception: diadem from the treasure of Priam ). A protective, possibly also fastening function is possible on helmets on the other hand, they could originally have had a veiling function especially with women. The fact that they attract glances could also be related to disaster-defensive ideas. Another possibility would be that they come from the end pieces of headbands hanging down at the neck of Hellenistic tiara and royal bandages.

Literature 

 Thomas Heller: The imperial regalia with special consideration of the imperial crown. GRIN-Verlag, Munich 2010, p. 10 f.
 Hermann Fillitz : Origin and Change of the Imperial Crown. In: Tobias Frese, Annette Hoffmann, Katharina Bull (eds.): Habitus. Norm and transgression in text and images. Festival for Lieselotte E. Saurma-Jeltsch. Akademie-Verlag, Berlin 2011, pp. 259-264.

Numismatics
Types of jewellery

Medieval art
Crown jewels
Crux gemmata
Votive offering